Liborio Vicente Sánchez Ledesma (born 9 October 1989) is a Mexican professional footballer who plays as a goalkeeper for Liga Nacional club Xinabajul.

Club career
He was one of the young promises of the C.D. Guadalajara and has played very well with the first team in the 2010 Copa Libertadores. Sánchez was loaned to Veracruz for the Apertura 2010 and Clausura 2011 seasons, and after returning he was loaned again to Querétaro for the Apertura 2011 and Clausura 2012 seasons, he was a vital role to the team making the playoffs in the Apertura 2011 season and they reached the semifinals losing 1–0 in the global score to Tigres the eventual champions of the season.

Honours
Mexico U23
CONCACAF Olympic Qualifying Championship: 2012
Toulon Tournament: 2012

References

1989 births
Living people
Mexican footballers
Mexican expatriate footballers
Footballers from Guadalajara, Jalisco
C.D. Guadalajara footballers
C.D. Veracruz footballers
Querétaro F.C. footballers
Deportivo Toluca F.C. players
Chiapas F.C. footballers
Cafetaleros de Chiapas footballers
Alianza Petrolera players
Liga Nacional de Fútbol de Guatemala players
Liga MX players
Ascenso MX players
Categoría Primera A players
2011 Copa América players
Mexico youth international footballers
Association football goalkeepers
Mexican expatriate sportspeople in Colombia
Expatriate footballers in Colombia
Mexican expatriate sportspeople in Guatemala
Expatriate footballers in Guatemala